Diego Junqueira was the winner in 2008, but he chose to not defend his title.
Thomaz Bellucci won in the final 3–6, 6–3, 6–1, against Juan Pablo Brzezicki.

Seeds

Draw

Final four

Top half

Bottom half

References
 Main Draw
 Qualifying Draw

Riviera di Rimini Challenger - Singles
Riviera di Rimini Challenger